An Expensive Visit is a 1915 American silent comedy film featuring Oliver Hardy.

Plot

Cast
 Ed Lawrence as Dad
 Oliver Hardy as Jack
 Raymond McKee as Dick
 Ben Walker as Tom
 C.W. Ritchie as Bill

See also
 List of American films of 1915
 Oliver Hardy filmography

External links

1915 films
American silent short films
American black-and-white films
1915 comedy films
1915 short films
Silent American comedy films
American comedy short films
1910s American films